Yfr1 is a Cyanobacterial functional RNA that was identified by a comparative genome based screen for RNAs in cyanobacteria. Further analysis has shown that the RNA is well conserved and highly expressed in cyanobacteria. and is required for growth under several stress condition Bioinformatics research combined with follow-up experiments have shown that Yfr1 inhibits the translation of the proteins PMM1119 and PMM1121 by an antisense interaction by base pairing at the ribosomal binding site.

See also
 Yfr2 RNA
 Cyano-S1 RNA motif
 Cyano-2 RNA motif

References

External links
 

Non-coding RNA
Antisense RNA